Kairos Prison Ministry International is an interdenominational Christian ministry that aims to address the spiritual needs of incarcerated men, women, youth, and their families. 

Kairos Prison Ministry is composed of three programs:  Kairos Inside, Kairos Outside, and Kairos Torch.

History 
Kairos Prison Ministry began in 1976 in Raiford, Florida as a program called Cursillo in Prison, based on the Cursillo movement. Dubbed a "short course in Christianity", the program had spread to six US states by 1978. It was eventually renamed "Kairos", which is a Greek term meaning "God's Special Time".  By 2018, Kairos Prison Ministry had become active in nearly forty US states and nine other nations.

Programs 
Kairos Prison Ministry is composed of three retreat programs. Retreat attendants do not need to be Christians to participate in the events.

Kairos Inside 
Kairos Inside is a program of Kairos Prison Ministry that works inside prisons to develop a sense of Christian fellowship. It is active in both men's and women's prisons, and is conducted by volunteers of the same gender. The 3.5-day retreat includes talks, discussions, and chapel meditations.

The Kairos Inside program strives to create Christian communities inside prisons. These communities pray or share fellowship together on a regular weekly and monthly basis.

Kairos Outside 
Kairos Outside is a program of Kairos Prison Ministry that ministers to female family members of the incarcerated. It offers a 2.5-day retreat that strives to create a support community with those navigating the incarceration of a friend or family member where women feel comfortable sharing experiences and can build relationships with others in similar situations. The retreat includes talks, music, prayer, and activities to build a supportive community.

Though the program was originally created as a support group for those whose loved ones are imprisoned, formerly-incarcerated women who were not able to attend a Kairos Inside retreat while in prison are also eligible for a Kairos Outside event.

Kairos Torch 
Kairos Torch is the youth mentorship program of Kairos Prison Ministry. It usually begins with a retreat in youth detention centers or correctional facilities for people under 25. The mission of the program is to engage the young prisoner's reasoning skills in order to help them make better life choices.

Kairos Torch volunteers commit to a weekly mentoring process with youth for six months after the retreat. The process aims to break the cycle of incarceration in a family, as most incarcerated youth have at least one parent who was also incarcerated.

References

Christian organizations based in the United States
Law enforcement in Florida
Organizations established in 1967